Thomas Abdy may refer to:

Sir Thomas Abdy, 1st Baronet, of Felix Hall (1612–1686), English lawyer and landowner
Sir Thomas Abdy, 1st Baronet, of Albyns (1810–1877), British Member of Parliament

See also
Abdy baronets